International Students Association may refer to one of several organisations:

International Students Association, Saint Petersburg
International Forestry Students' Association
International Law Students Association
International Students of History Association
International Association for Political Science Students
International Association of Physics Students
International Association of Students in Agricultural and Related Sciences